Kapag Puno Na ang Salop is a 1987 Filipino action film directed by Arturo San Agustin and starring Fernando Poe Jr. (also producer), Eddie Garcia, Paquito Diaz, Jose Romulo, Dencio Padilla, Roy Alvarez, and Rowena Moran. Produced by FPJ Productions, the film was released on November 26, 1987. Critic Luciano E. Soriano of the Manila Standard gave the film a positive review, praising the dialogue and Poe and Garcia's performances which elevate its formulaic plot.

Kapag Puno Na ang Salop was followed by two sequels: Ako ang Huhusga in 1989, and Hindi Ka Na Sisikatan ng Araw: Kapag Puno Na ang Salop Part-III in 1990.

Cast
Fernando Poe Jr. as P/Sgt. Isagani Guerrero
Eddie Garcia as Judge Rodrigo Valderrama
Paquito Diaz as Paquito Maraman
Jose Romulo
Dencio Padilla as Sgt. Sibal
Roy Alvarez as Dante
Rowena Moran
Lito Anzures as Mang Porong, Dante's uncle
Jimmy Fabregas as a doctor
Augusto Victa
Ernie Zarate
Nanding Fernandez
Delia Razon
Rudy Meyer
Rene Hawkins
Luis Benedicto
Aida Pedido
Eddie Tuazon
Mel Arca
Jimmy Reyes
Gwen Culmenares

Release
Kapag Puno Na ang Salop was released on November 26, 1987. It had a successful opening at the box office despite the then-ongoing Super Typhoon Sisang (internationally known as Typhoon Nina).

Critical response
Luciano E. Soriano of the Manila Standard gave Kapag Puno Na ang Salop a positive review, praising its clever dialogue and the larger-than-life performances of Poe and Garcia despite it utilizing the same narrative formula as Poe's other action films. He stated that "Never mind if we have seen this before. Poe knows how to hold the audience spellbound."

References

External links

1987 films
1987 action films
Filipino-language films
Films about corruption
Films about police officers
Films with screenplays by Pablo S. Gomez
Philippine action films
Films directed by Arturo San Agustin